This is a list of flag bearers who have represented Eritrea at the Olympics.

Flag bearers carry the national flag of their country at the opening ceremony of the Olympic Games.

See also
Eritrea at the Olympics

References

Flag bearers
Eritrea
Olympic flagbearers